Chacon may refer to:

 Chacón, a list of people with the surname Chacón or Chacon
 Captain Trudy Chacon, a fictional character in the 2009 film Avatar
 Chacon, New Mexico, United States, a town
 Chacon Creek, a small stream in Texas, United States
 Chacon (1912), a wooden fishing vessel in Alaska
 Chacon (1918), a ship lost at sea in 1937

See also
 Chaconne, a type of musical composition
 Chaconne (ballet), a 1976 ballet
 "The Chaconne", the last movement of Partita for Violin No. 2 (Bach), a work by Johann Sebastian Bach